Lysine-specific demethylase 3B is an enzyme that in humans is encoded by the KDM3B gene. KDM3B belongs to the alpha-ketoglutarate-dependent hydroxylase superfamily.

References

Further reading

External links 
 

Transcription factors
Human 2OG oxygenases
EC 1.14.11